Carnival in Flanders is a 1935 French historical romantic comedy film directed by Jacques Feyder. It is also widely known under its original title in French,  La Kermesse héroïque. A German-language version of the film was made simultaneously and was released under the title Die klugen Frauen, featuring Ernst Schiffner in one of his early film roles.

Plot
In 1616, when Flanders is part of the Hispanic Monarchy, the town of Boom, in the midst of preparations for its carnival, learns that a Spanish duke with his army is on the way to spend the night there.

Fearing that this will inevitably result in rape and pillage, the mayor — supported by his town council — has the idea of pretending to be newly dead, in order to avoid receiving the soldiers.  But his redoubtable wife Cornelia despises this stratagem and organises the other women to prepare hospitality and to adapt their carnival entertainments for the Spaniards (who insist on entering the town anyway).

Such is the warmth of the women's welcome that not only do the Spaniards refrain from misbehaviour, but on their departure the Duke announces a year's remission of taxes for the town.

Cornelia allows her husband to take the credit for their good fortune, but she has in the meantime thwarted his plans for their daughter to marry the town butcher instead of the young painter Brueghel whom she loves.

Cast
Françoise Rosay as Cornelia de Witte, Madame la Bourgmestre/Madame Burgomaster
André Alerme as Korbus de Witte, le bourgmestre/The Burgomaster (as Alerme)
Jean Murat as Le duc d'Olivarès/The Duke
Louis Jouvet as Le chapelain/The Priest
Lyne Clevers as La poissonnière/The Fish-Wife (as Lynne Clevers)
Micheline Cheirel as Siska
Maryse Wendling as La boulangère/The Baker's Wife
Ginette Gaubert as L'aubergiste/The Inn-Keeper's Wife
Marguerite Ducouret as La femme du brasseur/The Brewer's Wife
Bernard Lancret as Julien Breughel, a young painter
Alfred Adam as Josef Van Meulen, le boucher
Pierre Labry as L'aubergiste/The Inn-Keeper
Arthur Devère as Le poissonnier/The Fishmonger (as Arthur Devere)
Marcel Carpentier as Le boulanger/The Baker
Alexander D'Arcy as Le capitaine/The Captain (as Alexandre Darcy)
Claude Sainval as Le lieutenant/The Lieutenant (as Claude Saint Val)
Delphin as Le nain/The Dwarf

Background and production
Carnival in Flanders / La Kermesse héroïque was made by Jacques Feyder immediately after his dark psychological drama Pension Mimosas, and he said that he wanted to relax by making a farce, far removed from the present day.  He turned to a short story written at his suggestion ten years earlier by Charles Spaak, set in 17th century Flanders when it was under Spanish occupation. For the visual style of the film, Feyder wanted to pay tribute to the old masters of his native country — Brueghel, Frans Hals, Pieter de Hoogh — and an elaborate creation of a Flemish town was undertaken (in suburban Paris) by the designer Lazare Meerson.  Sumptuous costumes were provided by Georges K. Benda. The strong cast included Feyder's wife Françoise Rosay and Louis Jouvet.

The film was produced by the French subsidiary of the German firm Tobis, and it was made in two versions, French and German, with alternative casts (apart from Françoise Rosay who appeared in both).

Reception
On the strength of its richly detailed tableaux and the confident manner in which Feyder animated his historical farce, the film enjoyed considerable success in France and elsewhere in the world. The film historian Raymond Chirat pointed to the combination of the admirable sets, the splendid costumes, the biting irony of the story, and the quality of the acting which earned the film a cascade of awards, the admiration of the critics, and the support of the public. Georges Sadoul referred to "this important work, of exceptional beauty". Writing for The Spectator in 1936, Graham Greene gave the film a good review, praising director Feyder for his ability to add "into his ribald story a touch of the genuine, and simple emotion". Comparing the film to Restoration prose, Greene claims that the "photography moves with a fine strut", and summarizes it as "an admirable film, a little obscene like most good comedies, and beautifully acted". Feyder won the Best Director Award at the 4th Venice International Film Festival in 1936.

However, even on its first appearance in 1935 this tale of occupation and cheerful collaboration also caused uneasiness, and the screenwriter Henri Jeanson deplored the "Nazi inspiration" of the film. It was indeed enthusiastically praised in Germany, and its première in Berlin (15 January 1936) took place in the presence of Joseph Goebbels. (Yet, a few days after the outbreak of war in 1939, the film was banned in Germany and the occupied countries of Europe, and Jacques Feyder and Françoise Rosay subsequently sought refuge in Switzerland.)

It was in Belgium that the film caused greatest controversy, perhaps for the unflattering portrayal of Flemish leaders in the 17th century, or in suspicion of covert references to the German occupation of Belgian territory during the First World War.  At any rate, the release of the film led to brawls in cinemas in Antwerp, Ghent, and Bruges.

Even two decades later (1955), its enduring reputation irked François Truffaut who wrote, in a broadside against so-called 'successful' films: "In this regard, the most hateful film is unarguably La Kermesse héroïque because everything in it is incomplete, its boldness is attenuated; it is reasonable, measured, its doors are half-open, the paths are sketched and only sketched; everything in it is pleasant and perfect."

Nevertheless, this remains probably the most popular and widely known of Jacques Feyder's films.

Awards
 1936 Grand Prix du cinéma français
 1936 4th Venice International Film Festival : Jacques Feyder, best director
 1936 National Board of Review, USA : best foreign film
 1937 New York Film Critics Circle Awards : best foreign film
 1938 Kinema Junpo Awards : best foreign film

Influences
The film was the basis for an American musical, called Carnival in Flanders, which was produced in 1953.

Further reading
 L'Avant-scène: cinéma, 26: La Kermesse héroïque. (Paris: Avant-Scène, 1963). [The film script].

References

External links
 
 
 
 
 La Kermesse héroïque at filmsdefrance

French historical comedy films
1930s historical comedy films
1935 romantic comedy films
1935 films
French black-and-white films
Films directed by Jacques Feyder
Film controversies in Belgium
Films set in Flanders
Films set in the 1610s
Films shot in Bruges
Films shot in Paris
French multilingual films
French historical romance films
French romantic comedy films
1935 multilingual films
1930s French-language films
1930s French films